KNDP may refer to:

Kamerun National Democratic Party
Kayan New Land Party, in Burma